Burg Neulengbach is a castle in Neulengbach in Lower Austria, Austria. It was founded around 1189.

See also
List of castles in Austria

References

This article was initially translated from the German Wikipedia.

Castles in Lower Austria